The Wildflowers is a series of short novels ghostwritten by Andrew Neiderman under the name V.C. Andrews. The Wildflowers is a series of stories about a group of four teen girls in court ordered group therapy. The first four novels serve as prequels to the therapy sessions while the last deals with what happened after. An omnibus edition was released in 2001.

The four girls attend four group sessions in the home of therapist Dr. Marlowe, and they find that they have much in common, mainly their self-titled moniker 'OWPs' (Orphans With Parents).

The 'OWPs'

Misty (1999)
Misty's mother and father are divorced and constantly fight over alimony payments and other petty arguments. Misty becomes entangled with two separate male peers with whom she becomes increasingly impulsive. When confronted by police, she claims the stress over her parents' divorce led her down a destructive path, and she is ordered to attend therapy with Dr. Marlowe.

Star  (1999) 
Star, a black girl from the poorer side of town, lives with her drunk mother and little brother Rodney (their father had walked out on them). Star's mother eventually abandons this children with Star's grandmother. Star is sent to therapy when her boyfriend is beaten to death by his abusive father.

Jade (1999) 
Jade lives with her divorced parents in the midst of a fierce custody battle. Feeling alone in the world, her parents are more obsessed with their battles than with their daughter. Jade finds solace with a mysterious man in a chat room called 'Loneboy.' Jade is catfished and held captive by this man, but eventually escapes. Her uncaring parents and traumatic escape lead her to attempt suicide, sending her to the hospital, and eventually into therapy.

Cat  (1999) 
Cathy/Cat lives under her mother Geraldine's strict moral code. Cat's father sexually assaults Cat repeatedly as she progresses through puberty. Confused and upset by this, Cat eventually has a panic attack and is put in a psychiatric ward. After learning the reason for her daughter's panic attack, Geraldine divorces Howard, and Cat is put in therapy.

Into the Garden  (1999) 
The final book, from Cat's point of view, brings the four young OWPs together after the therapy sessions are complete. Cat is faced with the constant pressures of living alone and the threat of her perverted adoptive father coming back to try and take her again. Misty deals with her father's remarriage to a much younger woman, and Star thinks she has found the man of her dreams. Cat's father kidnaps her and eventually the girls, the police, and Dr. Marlowe come to her rescue. Dr. Marlowe takes Cat in, Jade and Misty go on to college, and Star marries. 

Novel series
Novels by V. C. Andrews